Charles Edwin Vanderburgh (December 2, 1829 – March, 3, 1898) was an American jurist.

Biography
Charles E. Vanderburgh was born in Saratoga County, New York on December 2, 1829. He graduated from Yale University in 1852, then taught school and studied law in Oxford, New York. In 1856, Vanderburgh moved to Minnesota Territory and practiced law in Minneapolis. From 1860 to 1880, Vanderburgh served as a Minnesota district court judge. From 1882 to 1894, Vanderburgh served on the Minnesota Supreme Court. He then practiced law. Vanderburgh died in Minneapolis, Minnesota.

In 1903, funds from Vanderburgh's estate were bequeathed to the Omaha Presbyterian Theological Seminary to support the construction of the president's home on the seminary's campus.

Notes

1829 births
1898 deaths
Politicians from Minneapolis
People from Clifton Park, New York
Yale University alumni
Minnesota state court judges
Justices of the Minnesota Supreme Court
Lawyers from Minneapolis
19th-century American judges
19th-century American lawyers